The 1985 Atlantic Conference baseball tournament was held from May 3 through 5 to determine the champion of the NCAA Division I the Atlantic 10 Conference, for the 1985 NCAA Division I baseball season.  This was the seventh iteration of the event, and was held at Hawley Field, home field of West Virginia in Morgantown, West Virginia.   won their second championship and earned the conference's automatic bid to the 1985 NCAA Division I baseball tournament.

Format and seeding
The top two teams in each division advanced to the tournament, with each division winner playing the second place team from the opposite division in the first round.  The teams played a double-elimination tournament.  West Virginia claimed the top seed over Penn State by tiebreaker.

Results

References

Tournament
Atlantic 10 Conference Baseball Tournament
Atlantic 10 Conference baseball tournament
Atlantic 10 Conference baseball tournament
Baseball in West Virginia
College sports in West Virginia
Sports competitions in West Virginia
Sports in Morgantown, West Virginia